Khuriabad or Khvoriabad may refer to:
 Khuriabad, Kermanshah
 Khuriabad, Kurdistan